Actinidia rubus is a woody climbing vine of the Actinidiaceae family and native to mountainous areas of the Chinese provinces of Sichuan and Yunnan. Branchlets and petioles are deep reddish brown. Yellow dioecious flowers (individual flowers are either male or female, but only one sex is to be found on any one plant so both male and female plants must be grown if seed is required) develop in June and are pollinated by bees and insects.

References

rubus
Flora of Sichuan
Flora of Yunnan
Plants described in 1913